Ciao marziano  is a 1980 Italian science fiction-comedy film directed by Pier Francesco Pingitore.

Plot 
An alien named Bix is sent from the planet Mars to Rome in order to learn the habits and customs of the humans.

Cast 

 Pippo Franco: Bix  
 Silvia Dionisio: Maddalena 
 Laura Troschel: Judy 
 Oreste Lionello: Lazzaro  
 Aldo Giuffré: Dr. Ponzio 
 Bombolo: Brigadier Pietro 
 Franco Citti: Er Cinese 
 Teo Teocoli: Don Paolo 
 Isabella Biagini: Isabella
 Luciana Turina: Singer
 Adriana Russo: Journalist
 Giancarlo Magalli: Mayor of Rome

See also   
 List of Italian films of 1980

References

External links

1980 films
1980s science fiction comedy films
Italian science fiction comedy films
Films set in Rome
Films shot in Rome
Films directed by Pier Francesco Pingitore
Italian satirical films
1980 comedy films
1980s Italian-language films
1980s Italian films